Mormonillidae is a family of planktonic marine copepods, the only member of the order Mormonilloida. There are five known species in two genera:
Mormonilla Giesbrecht, 1891
Mormonilla atlantica Wolfenden, 1905
Mormonilla phasma Giesbrecht, 1891
Neomormonilla Ivanenko & Defaye, 2006
Neomormonilla extremata Ivanenko & Defaye, 2006
Neomormonilla minor (Giesbrecht, 1891)
Neomormonilla polaris (G. O. Sars, 1900)

References

Copepods
Crustacean families